Tacticity (from , "relating to arrangement or order") is the relative stereochemistry of adjacent chiral centers within a macromolecule. The practical significance of tacticity rests on the effects on the physical properties of the polymer. The regularity of the macromolecular structure influences the degree to which it has rigid, crystalline long range order or flexible, amorphous long range disorder. Precise knowledge of tacticity of a polymer also helps understanding at what temperature a polymer melts, how soluble it is in a solvent and its mechanical properties.

A tactic macromolecule in the IUPAC definition is a macromolecule in which essentially all the configurational (repeating) units are identical. Tacticity is particularly significant in vinyl polymers of the type - where each repeating unit with a substituent R on one side of the polymer backbone is followed by the next repeating unit with the substituent on the same side as the previous one, the other side as the previous one or positioned randomly with respect to the previous one.  In a hydrocarbon macromolecule with all carbon atoms making up the backbone in a tetrahedral molecular geometry, the zigzag backbone is in the paper plane with the substituents either sticking out of the paper or retreating into the paper. This projection is called the Natta projection after Giulio Natta. Monotactic macromolecules have one stereoisomeric atom per repeat unit, ditactic to n-tactic macromolecules have more than one stereoisomeric atom per unit.

Describing tacticity

Diads
Two adjacent structural units in a polymer molecule constitute a diad. Diads overlap: each structural unit is considered part of two diads, one diad with each neighbor. If a diad consists of two identically oriented units, the diad is called a meso diad (abbreviated m) as in a meso compound.  If a diad consists of units oriented in opposition, the diad is called a racemo diad (r) as in a racemic compound.  In the case of vinyl polymer molecules, a meso diad is one in which the substituents are oriented on the same side of the polymer backbone: in the Natta projection they both point into the plane, or both point out of the plane.

Triads

The stereochemistry of macromolecules can be defined even more precisely with the introduction of triads.  An isotactic triad (mm) is made up of two adjacent meso diads, a syndiotactic triad  (also spelled syndyotactic) (rr) consists of two adjacent racemo diads, and a heterotactic triad (rm) is composed of a racemo diad adjacent to a meso diad.  The mass fraction of isotactic (mm) triads is a common quantitative measure of tacticity.

When the stereochemistry of a macromolecule is considered to be a Bernoulli process, the triad composition can be calculated from the probability Pm of a diad being meso. For example, when this probability is 0.25 then the probability of finding:
an isotactic triad is Pm2, or 0.0625
an heterotactic triad is 2Pm(1–Pm), or 0.375
a syndiotactic triad is (1–Pm)2, or 0.5625
with a total probability of 1. Similar relationships with diads exist for tetrads.

Tetrads, Pentads, etc.
The definition of tetrads and pentads introduce further sophistication and precision to defining tacticity, especially when information on long-range ordering is desirable.  Tacticity measurements obtained by carbon-13 NMR are typically expressed in terms of the relative abundance of various pentads within the polymer molecule, e.g. mmmm, mrrm.

Other conventions for quantifying tacticity
The primary convention for expressing tacticity is in terms of the relative weight fraction of triad or higher-order components, as described above.  An alternative expression for tacticity is the average length of meso and racemo sequences within the polymer molecule.  The average meso sequence length may be approximated from the relative abundance of pentads as follows:

Polymers

Isotactic polymers
Isotactic polymers are composed of isotactic macromolecules (IUPAC definition). In isotactic macromolecules all the substituents are located on the same side of the macromolecular backbone. An isotactic macromolecule consists of 100% meso diads.  Polypropylene formed by Ziegler–Natta catalysis is an isotactic polymer. Isotactic polymers are usually semicrystalline and often form a helix configuration.

Syndiotactic polymers
In syndiotactic or syntactic macromolecules the substituents have alternate positions along the chain. The macromolecule consists 100% of racemo diads. Syndiotactic polystyrene, made by metallocene catalysis polymerization, is crystalline with a melting point of 161 °C. Gutta percha is also an example for Syndiotactic polymer.

Atactic polymers
In atactic macromolecules the substituents are placed randomly along the chain. The percentage of meso diads is between 1 and 99%. With the aid of spectroscopic techniques such as NMR it is possible to pinpoint the composition of a polymer in terms of the percentages for each triad. 

Polymers that are formed by free-radical mechanisms such as polyvinyl chloride are usually atactic. Due to their random nature atactic polymers are usually amorphous. In hemi isotactic macromolecules every other repeat unit has a random substituent.

Atactic polymers are technologically very important. A good example is polystyrene (PS). If a special catalyst is used in its synthesis it is possible to obtain the syndiotactic version of this polymer, but most industrial polystyrene produced is atactic. The two materials have very different properties because the irregular structure of the atactic version makes it impossible for the polymer chains to stack in a regular fashion. The result is that, whereas syndiotactic PS is a semicrystalline material, the more common atactic version cannot crystallize and forms a glass instead. This example is quite general in that many polymers of economic importance are atactic glass formers.

Eutactic polymers

In eutactic macromolecules, substituents may occupy any specific (but potentially complex) sequence of positions along the chain. Isotactic and syndiotactic polymers are instances of the more general class of eutactic polymers, which also includes heterogeneous macromolecules in which the sequence consists of substituents of different kinds (for example, the side-chains in proteins and the bases in nucleic acids).

Head/tail configuration

In vinyl polymers the complete configuration can be further described by defining polymer head/tail configuration. In a regular macromolecule all monomer units are normally linked in a head to tail configuration so that all β-substituents are separated by three carbon atoms. In head to head configuration this separation is only by 2 carbon atoms and the separation with tail to tail configuration is by 4 atoms.  Head/tail configurations are not part of polymer tacticity but should be taken into account when considering polymer defects.

Techniques for measuring tacticity

Tacticity may be measured directly using proton or carbon-13 NMR.  This technique enables quantification of the tacticity distribution by comparison of peak areas or integral ranges corresponding to known diads (r, m), triads (mm, rm+mr, rr) and/or higher order n-ads, depending on spectral resolution.  In cases of limited resolution, stochastic methods such as Bernoullian or Markovian analysis may also be used to fit the distribution and predict higher n-ads and calculate the isotacticity of the polymer to the desired level.

Other techniques sensitive to tacticity include x-ray powder diffraction, secondary ion mass spectrometry (SIMS), vibrational spectroscopy (FTIR)  and especially two-dimensional techniques.  Tacticity may also be inferred by measuring another physical property, such as melting temperature, when the relationship between tacticity and that property is well-established.

References

External links
Tacticity @ École Polytechnique Fédérale de Lausanne
Application of spectroscopy in polymer charactisation @ University of California, Los Angeles

Polymer chemistry
Stereochemistry